Goosenecks State Park is a state park in the U.S. state of Utah, overlooking a deep meander of the San Juan River. The park is located near the southern border of the state a short distance from Mexican Hat, Utah. Eroded by water, wind, frost, and gravity, this is a classic location for observing incised meanders.

Goosenecks State Park is largely undeveloped.  Primitive campsites with picnic tables are scattered back from the edge of the cliff, and vault toilets are available.  Campers are advised to bring their own water, food, and other necessary gear.

The park received International Dark Sky Park designation by The International Dark-Sky Association in March, 2021. Night photography and stargazing are popular activities because there is little light pollution due to its remoteness.

There are no developed hiking trails in the park, but the Honaker Trail, a few miles to the northwest, provides access to the San Juan River.

References

External links

 Goosenecks State Park

Protected areas established in 1962
Protected areas of San Juan County, Utah
State parks of Utah
1962 establishments in Utah